Peter Clarke (born April 7, 1952), known professionally as Clarke Peters, is an American-British actor, writer, and director. He is best known for his roles as Lester Freamon in the television series The Wire (2002–2008) and Albert Lambreaux in the television series Treme (2010–2013).

Peters is also known for his roles in the films Endgame (2009), John Wick (2014), Three Billboards Outside Ebbing, Missouri (2017), Harriet (2019), and Da 5 Bloods (2020), the lattermost of which earned him a nomination for the BAFTA Award for Best Actor in a Supporting Role.

Early life
Peters was born Peter Clarke, the second of four sons, in New York City, and grew up in Englewood, New Jersey. At the age of 12, he had his first theater experience, in a school production of My Fair Lady. He began to have serious ambitions to work in the theater at the age of 14. He graduated from Dwight Morrow High School in 1970.

Career

Shortly before he left for Paris, Peters was arrested for obstructing police lines after an anti-Vietnam war demonstration but was cleared. He later said of this experience: "It made me more angry than anything else, because what I experienced was how impotent you could be as an American citizen."

In 1971, Peters' older brother enabled him to work as a costume designer for a production of the musical Hair in Paris, in which Peters later starred. While there, Peters received a letter from the FBI that accused him of draft evasion. When he went to New Jersey to contest this charge, he said: "if the enemy comes to America, I'll be there, but I don't know the Vietnamese. If you put me in the army, I'm not going there."

In 1973, Peters moved to London and changed his name to Clarke Peters, because Equity already had a few namesake members. While in London, he formed a soul band, The Majestics, and worked as a backup singer on such hits as "Love and Affection" by Joan Armatrading, "Boogie Nights" by Heatwave, and some David Essex songs. However, music was not Peters' main ambition, and he preferred to work in the theater.

His first West End theatre musical roles, which he received with assistance from his friend Ned Sherrin, were I Gotta Shoe (1976) and Bubbling Brown Sugar (1977). Other West End credits include Blues in the Night, Porgy and Bess, The Witches of Eastwick, Chicago, and Chess. Peters starred in the Sean Connery space Western Outland (1981) as the treacherous Sgt. Ballard, and he played an almost wordless role as Anderson, a vicious pimp in Neil Jordan's Mona Lisa (1986).

After writing several revues with Sherrin, in 1990 Peters wrote the revue Five Guys Named Moe, which received a Tony Award nomination for Best Book of a Musical. He followed this up with Unforgettable, a musical about Nat King Cole, which received scathing reviews. He also starred in the 2010 UK production of Five Guys Named Moe.

As a stage actor, Peters has also appeared on Broadway. His performance in The Iceman Cometh (1999) won him the Theatre World Award, and he portrayed the shady lawyer Billy Flynn in the revival of Chicago in 2000 and 2003. In regional theatre he has appeared in Driving Miss Daisy, The Wiz, Bubbling Brown Sugar, Ma Rainey's Black Bottom, Carmen Jones, and The Amen Corner.  In September 2011, Peters appeared on stage in a Sheffield Crucible Theatre production of Shakespeare's Othello, playing the title role opposite his Wire co-star Dominic West, who played Iago. In the 2014 New York Shakespeare in the Park festival, he played Gloucester in King Lear.

Peters is familiar to television viewers as Detective Lester Freamon in the HBO series The Wire. Peters also starred in the HBO mini-series The Corner, portraying a drug addict named Fat Curt, as well as the FX series Damages, as Dave Pell. Both The Wire and The Corner were created by writer and former The Baltimore Sun journalist David Simon. Peters also stars in Simon's HBO series Treme, in the role of Mardi Gras Indian chief Albert Lambreaux.  Peters appeared in two episodes of the U.S. time-travel/detective TV series Life On Mars (2008) as NYPD Captain Fletcher Bellow.

He also appeared in the UK show Holby City, as Derek Newman, the father of nurse Donna Jackson. He voiced a part in the Doctor Who animated episode Dreamland, and in the In Plain Sight episode "Duplicate Bridge" as a man in Witness Protection named Norman Baker/Norman Danzer. In 2010, Peters read Rita Hayworth and Shawshank Redemption for BBC 7. In that year, he also had a guest appearance as Professor Mark Ramsay in the pilot episode of the USA Network TV series Covert Affairs. From 2012 to 2013, Peters had a recurring role as Alonzo D. Quinn in the CBS TV series Person of Interest.

Peters' movie credits include Mona Lisa (1986), Notting Hill (1999), K-PAX (2001), Freedomland (2006), Marley & Me (2008), Endgame (2009; in which he played Nelson Mandela), Nativity! (2009), the Spike Lee film Red Hook Summer (2012; in which he played Bishop Enoch), and Three Billboards Outside Ebbing, Missouri (2017).

Peters narrated the audiobook version of Michael Chabon's novel Telegraph Avenue, released in September 2012 by HarperAudio. He also narrated the BBC radio series Black Music in Europe: a hidden history.

Personal life
Peters has had five children from three relationships. He and his first wife, Janine Martyne, who sang with him on recordings, had two children: a daughter, China Clarke, an architect, and a son, Peter Clarke, a tattoo artist. A subsequent relationship with Joanna Jacobs produced two sons: Joe Jacobs, an actor, and Guppy, who died of a kidney tumor in 1992, at the age of four. He has a son, Max, with his second wife, Penny; Max played the young Michael Jackson in the West End production of the musical Thriller – Live.

Peters splits his time between a house in the Charles Village section of Baltimore, which he bought in 2006 while working on The Wire, and one in London, where Penny and Max live.

He is a follower of the Brahma Kumaris.

Filmography

Film

Television

Awards and nominations

References

Further reading

External links

1952 births
Living people
American male film actors
American basses
American expatriates in the United Kingdom
American male stage actors
American theatre directors
American male writers
Brahma Kumaris
Dwight Morrow High School alumni
People from Englewood, New Jersey
African-American male actors
20th-century African-American male singers
American male television actors
20th-century American male actors
21st-century American male actors
Male actors from New York City
Male actors from New Jersey
Outstanding Performance by a Cast in a Motion Picture Screen Actors Guild Award winners
Theatre World Award winners
21st-century African-American people